Qarwa P'iq'iña (Aymara qawra, qarwa llama, p'iq'iña head, "llama head", Hispanicized spelling Carhuapequeña) is a mountain in the Andes of southern Peru, about  high. It is situated in the Puno Region, El Collao Province, Santa Rosa District, and in the Chucuito Province, Pisacoma District. The peaks of Qarwa P'iq'iña lie south of Arichuwa.

References

Mountains of Puno Region
Mountains of Peru